Huang Yao (Chinese: 黄尧; Pinyin: Huáng Yáo; 1917–1987) was a Chinese artist. Born in Shanghai, he had ancestral roots in Jiashan, Zhejiang. He is known for his creation of the Niubizi (牛鼻子) cartoons in the 1930s in Shanghai.

Notes

External links
 http://www.huangyao.org

1917 births
1987 deaths
Chinese comics artists
Artists from Shanghai